Idaea costaria is a species of moth of the family Geometridae. It is found in south-eastern Australia.

Idaea costaria is externally very similar to Idaea inversata but, unlike that species, has a two-coloured head pattern.  Idaea costaria has a creamy-white patch between the antennae, whereas I. inversata is dark reddish throughout this area.

References

Sterrhini
Moths of Australia
Moths described in 1857